Hometown Sports Indiana (HTSI) was a division of Webstream Productions, who purchased Hometown Television Corporation in 2009. HomeTown Sports Indiana was founded by Rick Vanderwielen in 2002 as a leased channel on Insight Cable.  Later Comcast elevated HTSI to a state-wide 24/7 television network airing ultra-regional sports.  Webstream, in partnership with WRTV, Channel 6.2 in Indianapolis began airing content exclusive after the completion of the Comcast contract. The network was viewable in nearly 1,000,000 digitally cabled homes in the Indianapolis, Lafayette and Terre Haute DMAs. HTSI was the official producer of Indiana High School Athletic Association (IHSAA) championship events  and has produced many championship events both within Indiana and nationally.
Notable broadcasts in 2009–2010 included:
 Indiana Bowling State Championship 
 Great Lakes Valley Conference Volleyball, Basketball and Baseball Championships
 University of Indianapolis Football and Basketball
 Wabash College, Franklin College and Marian University Football
 State Championships in Volleyball, Softball, Basketball, Football and Soccer.

In 2010, the Indianapolis Indians announced their home baseball games would be aired live on HomeTown Sports Indiana

The channel later switched its branding to Hometown Sports and News (HTSN) which featured a 24/7 rolling news wheel format with news, weather and sports updates, alongside features from "The List" and "Right This Minute", two of Scripps' internally-syndicated programs. It also included "Call 6 Investigations" and "Don't Waste Your Money" features. The channel retained live local and regional high school sports events, along with "The Outdoorsman with Buck McNeely". E/I programming was carried on Sunday mornings.

Starting with the team's 2014–2015 inaugural season, the channel carried coverage of Indy Fuel ECHL hockey. Both the Fuel and Indians retained online streaming rights, meaning that HTSI's online feed was unable to carry their games.

The network ended operations on October 1, 2016 and was replaced with a full-time feed of GRIT, due to the cost of sports rights and a chain-wide deal (and eventually common ownership) forcing the station to carry that network.

References

Sports television networks in the United States
2002 establishments in Indiana
2016 disestablishments in Indiana
Television stations in Indiana
Television channels and stations established in 2002
Television channels and stations disestablished in 2016